Dunakeszi is a district in central-northern part of Pest County. Dunakeszi is also the name of the town where the district seat is found. The district is located in the Central Hungary Statistical Region.

Geography 
Dunakeszi District borders with Vác District to the north, Gödöllő District to the east, Budapest to the south, Szentendre District to the west. The number of the inhabited places in Dunakeszi District is 4.

Municipalities 
The district has 3 towns and 1 village.
(ordered by population, as of 1 January 2013)

The bolded municipalities are cities.

Demographics

In 2011, it had a population of 78,634 and the population density was 763/km².

Ethnicity
Besides Hungarian majority, the main minorities are the German (approx. 800), Roma (550), Slovak (350), Romanian (300) and Russian  (150).

Total population (2011 census): 78,634
Ethnic groups (2011 census): Identified themselves: 70,028 persons:
Hungarians: 66,372 (94.78%)
Germans: 804 (1.15%)
Others and indefinable: 2,852 (4.07%)
Approx. 8,500 persons in Dunakeszi District did not declare their ethnic group at the 2011 census.

Religion
Religious adherence in the county according to 2011 census:

Catholic – 23,404 (Roman Catholic – 22,690; Greek Catholic – 694);
Reformed – 7,736;
Evangelical – 1,772;
Orthodox – 82;
Judaism – 104;
other religions – 1,640; 
Non-religious – 15,560; 
Atheism – 1,950;
Undeclared – 26,386.

Gallery

See also
List of cities and towns in Hungary

References

External links
 Postal codes of the Dunakeszi District

Districts in Pest County